The 2005–06 VCU Rams men's basketball team represented Virginia Commonwealth University during the 2005–06 NCAA Division I men's basketball season. The Rams played in the Colonial Athletic Association.

Schedule 

|-
!colspan=9 style="background:#000000; color:#FFD700;"| Regular season

|-
!colspan=6 style="background:#000000; color:#F8B800;"| CAA tournament
|-

|-

References 
 2005–06 Schedule
 Results

Vcu
VCU Rams men's basketball seasons
VCU Rams
VCU Rams